Michael or Mike Day may refer to:

 Michael Day (guitarist), American guitarist
 Michael Day (cricketer) (born 1974), Australian cricketer
 Mike Day (darts player) (born 1955), New Zealand darts player
 Mike Day (cyclist) (born 1984), American bicycle motocross (BMX) racer
 Michael S. Day, member of the Massachusetts House of Representatives
 Michael Day (paleoanthropologist), British anatomist and paleoanthropologist
 Mikey Day (born 1980), American comedian

See also
 Michael Bay, an American filmmaker
 Michael Davis (disambiguation)